Chained to the Nite is the first studio album by the Canadian heavy metal band Cauldron. Recordings for the basic tracks took place on 23–24 May 2008 at Chemical Sound in Toronto. Lead guitars were recorded in July 2008 at Highfield Sound, in Toronto. The album was mixed at Auslander in London and mastered at Mine! Studios in Nottingham.

There is a music video for "Chained up in Chains", directed by Justin McConnell.

Track listing

Personnel
Jason Decay - vocals, bass guitar
Ian Chains - guitar
Steel Rider - drums

2009 debut albums
Cauldron (band) albums
Earache Records albums